Nicholas Kraemer (born 7 March 1945, in Edinburgh, Scotland) is a British harpsichordist and conductor.

Career
Kraemer began his career as a harpsichordist. From playing continuo (on a harpsichord) at the back of an orchestra he proceeded to the front where he began directing from the harpsichord, notably the English Chamber Orchestra in the 1970s, where his repertoire widened, taking in the 19th and 20th centuries as well as Baroque music.

Kraemer has served as Artistic Director of the Irish Chamber Orchestra, the London Bach Orchestra, the music program of the Bath Festival and  English Touring Opera (then Opera 80). He founded and directed the Raglan Baroque Players. From 1971 to 1988 he was musical director of the W11 Opera children's opera, which he co-founded. He currently holds the positions of Principal Guest Conductor of the Manchester Camerata, Principal Guest Conductor of Music of the Baroque, Chicago and Permanent Guest Conductor of Orchester Musikkollegium Winterthur.

External links
Caroline Phillips Management: Nicholas Kraemer
Some Recollections of W11 Children’s Opera

British harpsichordists
British male conductors (music)
British performers of early music
Founders of early music ensembles
Virgin Classics artists
People educated at Lancing College
Musicians from Edinburgh
1945 births
Living people
21st-century British conductors (music)
21st-century British male musicians